The Ministry of Education, Youth and Sport (MoEYS;) is the government ministry responsible for promoting and regulating education, youth and sport development, in Cambodia.

, the Minister of Education, Youth and Sport is Dr. Hang Chuon Naron. The ministry's main offices are in Phnom Penh.

History
The ministry was established on 24 January 1996, although others date it to 1992 or 1993.

In 1999, the Ministry conducted an extensive literacy survey throughout Cambodia. Unlike the 1997 literacy survey done by the Ministry of Planning, which only consisted of yes–no questions according to UNESCO, the 1999 survey included a reading and writing test, and its results revealed that only 37.1% of the adult Cambodian population were functionally literate. In comparison, the 1997 survey reported a 66% literacy rate.

Directorates
The Ministry has six directorates:
Directorate General of Administration and Finance
Directorate General of Education
Directorate General of Higher Education
Directorate General of Policies and Planning
Directorate General of Sport
Directorate General of Youth
Inspectorate General

Ministers (since 1979)

See also
Education in Cambodia
Government of Cambodia
List of universities in Cambodia

References

External links
Ministry of Education, Youth and Sport
Ministry of Education, Youth and Sport 

1993 establishments in Cambodia
Education in Cambodia
Cambodia
Government ministries of Cambodia
Ministries established in 1993
Sport in Cambodia
Cambodia